Oliver Hanjorge Risser (born 17 September 1980) is a former footballer who played as a midfielder. He represented Namibia internationally as well as having spells playing in Norway, Finland, England and Belgium.

Club career
Born in Windhoek, Risser started his senior career with SpVgg EGC Wirges in 1999 and moved to Borussia Dortmund's reserve team in 2003, spending two seasons with the club in the German third division. He spent most of the 2005–06 season with SV Sandhausen in Oberliga Baden-Württemberg, one of the leagues in the fourth tier of German football. In April 2006, he moved to Icelandic first-division side Breidablik for three months, before returning to fourth-division football in Germany and signing with Bonner SC of Oberliga Nordrhein, where spent the entire 2006–07 season. He moved to Hannover 96 II in January 2008 after a few months without a club, but left the club at the end of the season. After another eight months without a club, Risser moved to Norway, joining Manglerud Star in March 2009.

On 21 August 2009, Lyn agreed a loan deal for him from Manglerud Star.

In June 2011, Risser went on a one-week trial with English League Two side Swindon Town, and after three days, manager Paolo Di Canio announced that Risser was to be offered a contract. He signed a two-year deal along with Ibrahim Atiku on the same day, 10 July. Ten days later, on 20 July, he was named Swindon captain for the 2011–12 season. He made a goalscoring debut for Swindon, netting the club's second goal with a 30-yard strike against Crewe Alexandra in a 3–0 win at The County Ground on the opening day of the season. In October 2011, Risser was replaced by Paul Caddis as club captain after losing his place in the side due to a groin injury. He scored his second goal for the club in a 1–1 draw against AFC Wimbledon in the Football League Trophy on 8 November 2011, a game in which Swindon went on to win 3–1 on penalties. Risser received the first red card of his Swindon career in a 2–1 away win against Northampton Town, receiving a straight red card for a tackle on Northampton's John Johnson. He went on to score two further goals during the campaign, in 2–0 victories against Torquay United and Barnet respectively. Risser made 40 appearances during the season, scoring four goals, as Swindon were promoted to League One as champions.

In August 2012, Risser joined League One side Stevenage on loan until January 2013, with a view to a permanent move. He made his Stevenage debut in the club's 3–2 loss to Dagenham & Redbridge in the Football League Trophy on 4 September 2012. Risser scored his first goal for Stevenage in a 1–1 draw against Doncaster Rovers at the Keepmoat Stadium on 22 September; netting with a glancing header from a Filipe Morais cross. He went on to make 13 appearances during the loan spell, although Stevenage turned down the option to make the move permanent, and Risser returned to his parent club in January 2013.

Shortly after returning to Swindon, it was announced that Risser had left the club after his contract was terminated by mutual consent. He subsequently signed for League Two side Aldershot Town on a free transfer on 6 January. Under manager Dean Holdsworth, he was a regular fixture in the side but after the arrival of new manager Andy Scott he was limited to appearances on the bench. By the end of the season he had made 15 appearances for Aldershot, scoring no goals. Risser was then believed to be one of the thirteen players made redundant as a result of the club going to administration.

International career
Risser has 27 caps for the Namibia national football team and represented Namibia at the 2008 African Cup of Nations.

Personal life
Risser's younger brother, Wilko, is also a footballer.

Honours
Swindon Town
Football League Two (1): 2011–12

Career statistics

Club

A.  The "League" column constitutes appearances and goals (including those as a substitute) in the 3. Liga, Úrvalsdeild, Norwegian Second Division, Adeccoligaen, Veikkausliiga, and the Football League.
B.  The "Other" column constitutes appearances and goals (including those as a substitute) in the Football League Trophy.

International

References

External links
 Profile at Weltfussball.de  
 
 
 Oliver Risser Interview

1980 births
Living people
Namibian people of German descent
White Namibian people
Footballers from Windhoek
Namibia international footballers
2008 Africa Cup of Nations players
Borussia Dortmund II players
SV Sandhausen players
Oliver Risser
Bonner SC players
German expatriates in Iceland
Hannover 96 II players
Kuopion Palloseura players
Manglerud Star Toppfotball players
Ramblers F.C. players
Aldershot Town F.C. players
Swindon Town F.C. players
Stevenage F.C. players
English Football League players
Expatriate footballers in Norway
Namibian expatriate sportspeople in Norway
Expatriate footballers in Germany
Expatriate footballers in Finland
Expatriate footballers in England
Namibian expatriate sportspeople in England
Expatriate footballers in Belgium
Eliteserien players
Expatriate footballers in Iceland
Association football midfielders
Lierse Kempenzonen players
Veikkausliiga players
Oliver Risser
Namibian expatriate footballers
Namibian men's footballers